Wide Mouth Branch is a  long 3rd order tributary to Lanes Creek in Anson County, North Carolina.  This is the only stream of this name in the United States.

Course
Wide Mouth Branch rises in a pond on the northeast side of Marshville, North Carolina in Union County.  Wide Mouth Branch then flows east-southeast into Anson County to meet Lanes Creek about 0.5 miles west of Peachland.

Watershed
Wide Mouth Branch drains  of area, receives about 48.1 in/year of precipitation, has a topographic wetness index of 447.40 and is about 23% forested.

References

Rivers of North Carolina
Rivers of Anson County, North Carolina
Rivers of Union County, North Carolina
Tributaries of the Pee Dee River